African Beat may refer to:

 The African Beat, a 1962 jazz album released by Art Blakey and The Afro-Drum Ensemble 
 African Beats, King Sunny Adé's band
 "Afrikaan Beat", a song recorded in 1962 by Bert Kaempfert